The 2007 North American, Central American and Caribbean Championships was a regional track and field competition held at the Flor Blanca National Stadium in San Salvador, El Salvador, from July 13–15, 2007. It was the inaugural edition of a senior track and field championship for the NACAC region. A total of forty-three events were contested, 22 by male and 21 by female athletes.

The championships served as preparation for the 2007 Pan American Games, held later that month, for many of the senior athletes. Canada and Cuba, two of the region's strongest countries in the sport, did not send a delegation to participate. One further event—the women's 10,000 metres—was initially scheduled for the championships, but was subsequently not held in San Salvador.

The United States sent the largest contingent to the competition and, although many were developmental athletes, Americans dominated the competition, winning twenty-eight of the events and fifteen minor medals for a total of 43. Mexico were the next best performers, claiming four golds, fourteen silvers and two bronze medals. Trinidad and Tobago took three golds in their eleven medal haul, while the hosts El Salvador also won three events.

Mary Jayne Harrelson completed an 800/1500 metres double win. Americans Calvin Smith Jr. and Debbie Dunn took the 400 metres individual titles, before going on the help the relay teams to another gold. Cristina López of El Salvador won the 10 km walk title and went on to win Pan American gold later that month. The NACAC high jump silver medallist Romary Rifka improved to the gold at that tournament.

Medal summary

Men

Women

Medal table

Participating nations

 (1)
 (1)
 (7)
 (2)
 (5)
 (5)
 (6)
 (13)
 (3)
 (28)
 (12)
 (2)
 (6)
 (21)
 (31)
 (4)
 (1)
 (19)
 (19)
 (10)
 (3)
 (5)
 (19)
 (1)
 (45)
 (6)

References

Results
I NACAC Senior T&F Championships. SIADA - Sistema de Resultados. Retrieved on 2010-12-19.

External links
Official NACAC website

International athletics competitions hosted by El Salvador
NACAC Championships
2007 in Salvadoran sport
2007 in Central American sport
NACAC Championships in Athletics